Grêmio Recreativo Cultural Social Escola de Samba Vai-Vai , popularly known simply as Vai-Vai is a  samba school from São Paulo, Brazil. At the beginning of the 20th century, there were in the neighborhood Bixiga, at Rua Marques Lion, a football team called Cai-Cai which used the colors black and white, which formed part of a group of crying and played in the field of Lusitana, near the intersection of rock and Una, Saracura River region. Around 1928 a group of friends, led by Livinho and Benedito Sardinha helped to animate the games and parties performed by the Cai-Cai, but were always seen as freeloaders and troublemakers, being called jokingly as "the Vae-Vae gang." Expelled from the Cai-Cai, they created the "Pack of the Tattered", and in parallel, the Vae-Vae Carnival and Sports Cord, which was formalized in 1930.

Vai-Vai is a multiple times champion at the Carnival of São Paulo.

Classifications

See also 
 Torcida Jovem
 Higienópolis-Mackenzie (São Paulo Metro)
 Line 4 (São Paulo Metro)

References

External links
 Vai-Vai Official site
 Vai-Vai Facebook
 Vai-Vai Instagram
 Vai-Vai Twitter

Samba schools of São Paulo
1931 establishments in Brazil